NOX is a piece of the software-defined networking (SDN) ecosystem. Specifically, it's a platform for building network control applications.

The first SDN technology to get real name recognition was OpenFlow, and NOX was initially developed at Nicira Networks side by side with OpenFlow — NOX was the first OpenFlow controller. Nicira donated NOX to the research community in 2008, and since then, it has been the basis for many and various research projects in the early exploration of the SDN space.

To a developer, NOX:

 Provides a C++ OpenFlow 1.0 API
 Provides fast, asynchronous IO
 Is targeted at recent Linux distributions.
 Includes sample components for:
 Topology discovery
 Learning switch
 Network-wide switch

Further reading

External links
 About NOX

Application software
Computing platforms